Charles Heyl may refer to:

 Charles H. Heyl (1849–1926), US Army officer and Medal of Honor recipient
 Charles W. Heyl (1857–1936), American businessman, fire chief, and politician